WRSA-FM (96.9 FM, "Mix 96.9") is an adult contemporary-formatted radio station serving the Huntsville, Alabama, area.

The broadcast transmitter and tower for WRSA-FM is located on Brindlee Mountain, and the station's studios are located at 8402 Memorial Parkway SW (US 231) in Huntsville, a former bank.

History
Before a gradual format change in the late 1990s away from its longtime "Beautiful 97" image, WRSA-FM was one of the last remaining easy listening-formatted radio stations in the United States. Founded and constructed in 1964 and early 1965 by Redstone Arsenal engineer Paul R. Nielsen, WRSA went on the air in late November 1965, and continues to be one of the top-rated radio stations in the Huntsville, Alabama radio market.

Beautiful 97 (1965–2001)
WRSA started off as "Beautiful 97" in November 1965. It was an easy listening formatted-station for some 36 years, broadcasting the genre long after it had disappeared from most U.S. radio markets by the 1980s. During the 1970s, the station was the local home of the weekly Saturday-afternoon broadcasts of the Metropolitan Opera, sponsored then by Texaco. By the 1980s, that program moved to WNDA, now WRTT-FM. While public station WLRH began operations in 1976 and would normally be expected to carry the Met broadcasts, it has never done so, up to this day.

Lite 96.9 (2001–2015)
After briefly calling itself "Alabama's Big Easy", in 2001 the easy listening-formatted station changed its format to soft rock. As such, it was rebranded as "Lite 96.9." As "Lite 96.9," it continued until it was rebranded again as "Mix 96.9" on January 11, 2015. The last song played on "Lite 96.9" was "I Will Remember You" by Sarah McLachlan. The first song played on "Mix 96.9" was "Hit Me With Your Best Shot" By Pat Benatar.

Mix 96.9 (2015–present)
On January 11, 2015, the station flipped its format for the second time, from soft rock to adult contemporary, under the branding "Mix 96.9". WRSA plays songs from the 1980s through the present. Every year from November to December, "Mix 96.9" plays Christmas music until December 26.

Personalities
Notable local on-air personalities on WRSA-FM include Abby Kay on mornings. Other personalities include mid-day host Blair Davis, afternoon host Jerome "Fish" Fisher, traffic reporter Bill Taylor, and weekend host J.J. McCall.

Previous on-air personalities include former morning co-host John Malone, former morning and mid-day host Bonny O'Brien and traffic reporter Allen Moore.

Previous logo

Lite 96.9's logo, used from 2001 to 2015.

References

External links
WRSA-FM official website

RSA
Mainstream adult contemporary radio stations in the United States
Radio stations established in 1965
Cullman County, Alabama
1965 establishments in Alabama